Paravur, (Paravoor), is a town and a municipality in the Kollam Metropolitan Area of Kollam district in the Indian state of Kerala. Paravur railway station is the last station in Kollam district which is on the route to Trivandrum while travelling towards South India.

Governance and Wards
Paravur Municipality consists of Kottapuram, Koonayil, Thekkumbhagam, Chillakkal, Perumpuzha, Nedungolam, Pozhikara, Maniyamkulam, Kurumandal, Kottamoola, Attinpuram & Kochalummoodu. Paravur Municipality is a Grade-II Municipality of Kerala.

Geography
Paravur is located at 8.78 N 76 E. It has an average elevation of 10 metres (32 feet).
Paravur, 21 kilometers from the Kollam, is a narrow skirt of land stretching in between the backwaters and the sea. There is an elevation of 6 metres above sea level, extending to 16 metres on the inland. Ithikkara river is flowing through paravur. Nedungolam in paravur is now famous for mangrove forest.

Demographics
 India census, Paravur had a population of 37,245 where 16,874 are males and 20,371 are females thus the average sex ratio of Paravoor is 1,207.
Paravur has an average literacy rate of 92.5%, higher than the national average of 59.5%: male literacy is 94.7%, and female literacy is 90.7%. In Paravur, 10% of the population are under 6 years of age. Total number of households are 9,074.

History
Pozhikara was the administrative headquarters of Paravur. Remnants of the old fort, Thaana (police station) and Anchalappees (post office) still remain. A mint of the erstwhile Travancore Kingdom for printing and punching their currencies was once situated at Paravur. Paravur panchayat was formed in 1936 as one of the four panchayats sanctioned by Sir C.P.Ramaswamy Iyer (Diwan-Travancore).

Transport

Road

There are so many important roads in Paravur, connecting Kollam city and neighbouring towns like Chathannoor, Parippally, Varkala, Poothakkulam etc. The 14.1 km long Paravur-Kollam Coastal Road is connecting Kollam city with Paravur, via Kollam Beach, Paapanasam Beach, Kakkathoppu, Mukkom, Thanni and Pozhikara.

Rail

Paravur railway station, an "Adarsh station", is situated at a distance of half kilometer away from the heart of Paravur town. Paravur is connected to various cities in India through Indian Railways. The station code for Paravur railway station is 'PVU'.

Industrial development
As part of the industry sector development plans of Kollam district, an IT Park would be setting up at Paravur Municipal area in an extent of 5 acres of land. The land can be acquired with the assistance of Land Use Board or Paravur Municipality. rail-Road linkages will be established. The Government also have plans to set up a Coir manufacturing unit and a Handloom unit at Paravur and considering the possibilities for setting up a food park also.

People from Paravur
 K. C. Kesava Pillai (1868-1914) poet
 G. Devarajan (1927-2006) music composer
 P. Ravindran (1922-1997) Politician Ex Minister
 C.V. Padmarajan Politician Ex Minister
 P. K. Gurudasan Politician Ex Minister
 Paravoor Ramachandran (1945-2011) Malayalam film actor

See also

 Paravur Lake
 Paravur temple accident
 Paravur Thekkumbhagam
 Chirakkara
 Polachira
 Mavintamoodu
 Poothakkulam
 Pozhikkara
 Puttingal Temple
 Kollam Beach
 Kollam District

Climate
Köppen-Geiger climate classification system classifies Paravur's climate as tropical wet and dry (Aw).

References

External links

 Remaining Date for Paravur Municipality Election 2020
 
 Kerala Temple Fire: PM Modi Arrives In Kollam With 15 Doctors
 Kollam temple tragedy: Criminal neglect
 Remembering a master composer
 Paravur-Kollam coastal road opened to traffic

Cities and towns in Kollam district
History of Kollam
1988 establishments in India
Geography of Kollam district
Estuaries of India